The 1927 All-Ireland Senior Hurling Championship Final was the 40th All-Ireland Final and the culmination of the 1927 All-Ireland Senior Hurling Championship, an inter-county hurling tournament for the top teams in Ireland. The match was held at Croke Park, Dublin, on 4 September 1927, between Cork and Dublin. The Munster champions lost to their Leinster opponents on a score line of 4-8 to 1-3.

Match details

1
All-Ireland Senior Hurling Championship Finals
Cork county hurling team matches
Dublin GAA matches
All-Ireland Senior Hurling Championship Final
All-Ireland Senior Hurling Championship Final, 1927